Hayden Roulston  (born 10 January 1981, in Ashburton) is a former New Zealand professional racing cyclist. He won the silver medal in the men's 4000 m individual pursuit and a bronze medal in the men's 4000 m team pursuit at the 2008 Summer Olympics in Beijing. He won the New Zealand road cycling championships on four occasions (2006, 2011, 2013,  2014), the Tour of Southland on three occasions (2006, 2007, 2008) and came tenth in the 2010 edition of Paris - Roubaix.

Professional career
Roulston was a talented junior rider on both road and track and competed for New Zealand on the track and initially on the road for a club team in France. His season with Discovery Channel featured some impressive rides but was interrupted by injury and eventually ended when he resigned after an incident in a Christchurch bar. He attempted to relaunch his professional road career in the US when he signed for Continental Pro team  and began strongly with two top ten stage finishes in the Tour of California beating many big name ProTour regulars. Unfortunately for Roulston his first year at HealthNet ended when a medical examination revealed irregular heart activity and he was advised to stop riding immediately.

Back home in New Zealand he experimented with some alternative remedies and was soon back riding – and winning.  Without a contract but still motivated to ride he won the National Road Race title in 2006 and back to back Tour of Southland and Tour of Wellington titles in 2006 and 2007. In addition to the road races he returned to the track and won several titles at the New Zealand and Oceania track championships.

Roulston had invested a six-figure sum with a New Zealand company that failed in October 2007 during the global financial crisis. Roulston confided in Craig Adair, a track cycling gold medallist at the 1982 Commonwealth Games, that he was about to pull out of the preparations for the 2008 Summer Olympics, but Adair and four of his friends decided to provide finance for him during this difficult time, and Roulston continued with his preparations.

Roulston was selected for the New Zealand team to compete at the 2008 World Track Championships in Manchester where he narrowly missed medals in the 4000 m individual pursuit (4th) and Team Pursuit (4th) as well as finishing 9th in the Madison with Greg Henderson. Having performed so strongly in Manchester, he was selected for the Beijing Olympics, where he focused on improving his 4th placed pursuit rides.  Former New Zealand track coach Ron Cheatley suggested his best bet will be to drop the Madison and focus on the complementary pursuit events in much the same fashion as Kiwi pursuit rider Sarah Ulmer. Ulmer quit road racing and focused solely on her pursuit preparation before the 2004 Athens Olympics where she went on to smash the world record and take the gold medal in the women's 3000 m individual pursuit.

At the 2008 Beijing Olympics, Roulston won the silver medal in the 4000 m individual pursuit, defeated in the gold medal race by Bradley Wiggins. He also featured as a member of the bronze medal-winning New Zealand team pursuit squad, although he did not race in the qualifying rounds. He came 10th in the Madison with his teammate Greg Henderson.

In September 2008, Roulston announced that he would be riding for Cervélo TestTeam in 2009, with riders including reigning Tour de France champion Carlos Sastre and multiple Tour de France stage winner Thor Hushovd.

In the 2009 Tour of California, Roulston began a perfectly executed lead out to allow team sprinter Thor Hushovd to win Stage 3. In stage 7 Roulston almost won the stage himself after breaking free from a ten-man breakaway that included Fränk Schleck, George Hincapie and Christian Vande Velde. Roulston was 2nd after a photo finish with Rinaldo Nocentini. Roulston finished 35th overall.

Roulston came fourth in the 194km 2010 Kuurne–Brussels–Kuurne race. In the cold and windy conditions, Roulston Thor Hushovd and Jeremy Hunt chased a three man breakaway which led to Roulston finishing one minute behind the winner Bobbie Traksel.

In April 2010, Hayden Roulston came 10th in the 259 kilometre Paris-Roubaix race. He finished almost seven minutes behind the winner Fabian Cancellara.  The Paris - Roubaix is one of the five "monuments" or most important races of the cycling season. 

Roulston came second in the Men's road race at the 2010 Commonwealth Games, winning the silver medal. Roulston was sick leading up to the race. The 168km race was run in very hot conditions in Delhi. He said of the race "The whole plan today was to make the race hard. We had no choice, we've got no sprinter and the world's fastest sprinters are here so for us to execute it like we did, I think the boys should be really proud".

In December 2010, Hayden Rouston won the 80 kilometre Festival of Cycling in Christchurch. Hayden Roulston spent his last few seasons riding as a key domestique for Fabian Cancellara at Trek Factory Racing.

In October 2015 Roulston announced his retirement from road racing, having previously revealed that he would make a return to the track with a view to competing in the team pursuit at the 2016 Summer Olympics.

Hayden Roulston competed in March 2016 in Le Race with the intent of obtaining a "good, intensive training ride". He won the 100 kilometre race from Cathedral Square in Christchurch to Akaroa dominating in the cross winds and forcing the pace on the climb to Hilltop. He said of the win "I haven't won for a long time so it's always nice to get the result. I wanted a hard day out and I definitely got that."

Major results

2002
 2nd Overall Tour of Wellington
1st Stage 2
 3rd  Team pursuit, Commonwealth Games
2003
 1st Stage 7 Tour de Pologne
 2nd  Madison (with Greg Henderson), UCI Track World Championships
 2nd Overall Tour de Vineyards
1st Stages 2 & 3
2004
 1st Stage 1 Tour de Wallonie
 1st Stage 3 Tour of Southland
 2nd Tour du Doubs
 3rd Road race, National Road Championships
2006
 1st  Road race, National Road Championships
 National Track Championships
1st  Individual pursuit
1st  Team pursuit
 1st  Overall Tour of Wellington
1st Stages 3, 5 & 6
 1st  Overall Tour de Vineyards
1st Stages 1, 2 & 3
 1st  Overall Tour of Southland
1st Stage 1
 1st Stage 2 McLane Pacific Classic
 2nd  Points race, Commonwealth Games
2007
 1st  Road race, Oceania Road Championships
 1st  Madison, Oceania Track Championships
 1st  Overall Tour of Wellington
1st Stages 1, 4 & 6
 1st  Overall Tour of Southland
 1st Pegasus Subway Classic
2008
 1st  Overall Tour des Deux Sevres
1st Prologue
 1st  Overall Tour of Southland
 Tour of Wellington
1st Stages 4 & 6
 Olympic Games
2nd  Individual pursuit
3rd  Team pursuit
 3rd Overall Tour de Vineyards
1st Stages 2 & 3
2009
 1st Stage 1 (TTT) Tour of Southland
 7th Overall Ster Elektrotoer
2010
 1st  Overall Tour of Southland
 1st Stage 1 (TTT) Vuelta a España
 1st Stage 6 Danmark Rundt
 2nd  Road race, Commonwealth Games
 4th Kuurne–Brussels–Kuurne
 10th Paris–Roubaix
1st Festival of Cycling
2011
 1st  Road race, National Road Championships
 Tour of Southland
1st Stages 4 & 8
2013
 1st  Road race, National Road Championships
2014
 1st  Road race, National Road Championships
2016
 1st Le Race

References

External links

 

1981 births
Commonwealth Games silver medallists for New Zealand
Commonwealth Games bronze medallists for New Zealand
Cyclists at the 2004 Summer Olympics
Cyclists at the 2008 Summer Olympics
Cyclists at the 2016 Summer Olympics
Living people
Members of the New Zealand Order of Merit
New Zealand male cyclists
Olympic bronze medalists for New Zealand
Olympic cyclists of New Zealand
Olympic silver medalists for New Zealand
New Zealand track cyclists
Olympic medalists in cycling
Cyclists at the 2010 Commonwealth Games
Medalists at the 2008 Summer Olympics
Sportspeople from Ashburton, New Zealand
People educated at Ashburton College
Commonwealth Games medallists in cycling
Medallists at the 2010 Commonwealth Games